Chief Secretary of Balochistan, also referred to as CS Balochistan, is the bureaucratic chief and highest-ranking official of the Government of Balochistan, Pakistan. The appointment of the Chief Secretary is appointed directly by the Prime Minister of Pakistan. The position of Chief Secretary is equivalent to the rank of Federal Secretary and the position holder usually belongs to the Pakistan Administrative Service.

The Chief Secretary is the province's administrative boss as all the divisional commissioners and administrative secretaries of province report to him. The CS in turn reports to the Chief Minister of Balochistan, however the Chief Secretary is not under the charge of the Chief Minister as only the Prime Minister can appoint or remove the CS from his position. The Chief Secretary also serves as the Chief Advisor to the Chief Minister and as Secretary to the provincial Cabinet.

List of chief secretaries
The following table lists down the names of chief secretaries that have remained in office since 1970.

See also
 Federal Secretary
 Pakistan Administrative Service
 Establishment Secretary of Pakistan
 Cabinet Secretary of Pakistan
 Chief Secretary Sindh
 Chief Secretary Khyber Pakhtunkhwa
 Chief Secretary Punjab
 Chief Secretary (Pakistan)

References

External links 
 Chief Secretary Website

Government of Balochistan, Pakistan
Pakistani government officials